Alfred Körte (September 5, 1866 – September 6, 1946) was a German classical philologist who was a native of Berlin. He was a younger brother to surgeon Werner Körte (1853–1937) and archaeologist Gustav Körte (1852-1917). In 1896 he married Frieda Gropius, the daughter of the architect Martin Gropius (1824–1880).

In 1890 he earned his doctorate from the University of Bonn, where he was a student of Hermann Usener (1834–1905). In 1899 he became a full professor at the University of Greifswald, and in 1903 was successor to Erich Bethe (1863–1940) at the University of Basel. Successively, he was a professor at the Universities of Giessen (from 1906), Freiburg (from 1914) and Leipzig (from 1917), where he remained until his retirement in 1934. Körte was a member of the Saxon Academy of Sciences and the German Archaeological Institute.

Alfred Körte was a leading expert in the study of Greek comedies, being remembered for his editorial and translational work involving papyrus fragments left by the dramatist Menander. He also specialized in the field of Hellenistic poetry.

In 1900 he assisted his brother, Gustav, with initial excavation of the ancient city of Gordion in Asia Minor, subsequently being the co-author of Gordion: Ergebnisse der Ausgrabung im Jahre 1900 (1904).

Beginning in 1923, with philologist Richard Heinze (1867–1929), he was publisher of the magazine "Hermes". He also contributed numerous articles to the "Pauly-Wissowa", a renowned German encyclopedia of classical scholarship.

References 

 This article is based on a translation of an equivalent article at the German Wikipedia, whose sources include: biography of Alfred Körte @ NDB/ADB Deutsche Biographie

German classical philologists
Writers from Berlin
Scientists from Berlin
Academic staff of the University of Basel
Academic staff of the University of Freiburg
Academic staff of Leipzig University
Academic staff of the University of Giessen
Academic staff of the University of Greifswald
Archaeologists from Berlin
1866 births
1946 deaths
German male writers
Travelers in Asia Minor